Australentulus is a genus of proturans in the family Acerentomidae.

Species
 Australentulus australiensis (Womersley, 1932)
 Australentulus betschi Nosek, 1978
 Australentulus dauphinense Nosek, 1978
 Australentulus delamarei Nosek, 1978
 Australentulus dituxeni Nosek, 1978
 Australentulus hauseri Nosek, 1976
 Australentulus indicus Prabhoo, 1972
 Australentulus intermedius Tuxen, 1967
 Australentulus noseki Tuxen, 1967
 Australentulus occidentalis (Womersley, 1932)
 Australentulus orientalis Prabhoo, 1972
 Australentulus phrachedee (Imadaté, 1965)
 Australentulus ravenalensis François, 1994
 Australentulus reginae Tuxen, 1967
 Australentulus tillyardi (Womersley, 1932)
 Australentulus tuxeni Prabhoo, 1975
 Australentulus victoriae Tuxen, 1967
 Australentulus westraliensis (Womersley, 1932)

References

Protura